Uri Ilan (17 February 1935 – 13 January 1955) was an Israeli soldier who committed suicide in a Syrian prison, after being captured in a covert operation on the Golan Heights. He became a symbol of courage and patriotism in Israel.

Biography

Early life

Ilan was born in 1935 in kibbutz Gan Shmuel. His mother was Fayge Ilanit, a member of the First Knesset. He joined the Golani Brigade in 1953. He was the great-grandson of the famed Talmudic scholar Rabbi Shimon Shkop.

Capture and suicide
According to the Israel Defense Forces, he was captured by the Syrians on December 8, 1954, near a Syrian post in the Golan Heights along with four soldiers in his team. The soldiers were taken into custody in Quneitra and sent to a Damascus prison for interrogation.

In the Syrian prison, they were sent to separate cells and tortured. Believing his comrades to have been killed, as falsely claimed by his captors in an attempt to weaken morale, Ilan hanged himself on 13 January 1955 in his prison cell, using a rope made from the fabric of the mattress cover. In his clothing, Ilan hid nine notes addressed to his homeland, Israel, and his family. The most famous is a scrap of paper on which he wrote the Hebrew words "לא בגדתי. התאבדתי" ("Lo bagadeti, hitabadeti") which means: "I did not betray. I committed suicide," that is to say, he chose to end his own life so as not to reveal military secrets under torture.
He was buried on 14 January 1955 in Kibbutz Gan Shmuel.

Return to Israel
On 29 March 1956 the four Israeli soldiers who were captured along with Uri Ilan were returned to Israel in exchange for 40 Syrian soldiers.

Ilan's suicide and the notes he left behind set off a great outpouring of grief in Israel, but also a sense of national pride.

References

1935 births
1955 suicides
Kibbutzniks
Israeli soldiers
Israeli torture victims
Israeli military personnel who committed suicide
Suicides in Syria
Israeli people who died in prison custody
Prisoners who died in Syrian detention
People who committed suicide in prison custody
Israeli people imprisoned abroad
Torture in Syria
Israeli prisoners of war
20th-century Israeli military personnel
Prisoners of war held by Syria
1955 deaths
Suicides by hanging